As Dez Mais (Portuguese for The Top Ten) is the tenth studio album by Brazilian rock band Titãs, and their first cover album. It was released in 1999, selling more than 400,000 copies. It was their last album with guitarist Marcelo Fromer, who died in 2001 just a few days before the first days of recordings of As Dez Mais' studio successor, A Melhor Banda de Todos os Tempos da Última Semana.

Track listing

Single 
"Aluga-se" was released in 1999 as the thirteenth single by the band. The original song was composed and performed by Brazilian rock singer Raul Seixas, and it was featured on his 1980 album Abre-Te Sésamo.

Music video 
The music video for the song shows the band performing it inside a night club crowded with young people drinking, dancing and smoking. At certain point, some of the band members are seen playing a card game of some sort, and then playing pool.

Critical reception 

Writing for Folha de S.Paulo, Lúcio Ribeiro panned the album, stating it was another commercial play by the band that "seems to have permanently given up composing new material  to fill an album". He also said the group "annihilated" all ten tracks, turning "Rotina" in a "boring ska" and depriving "Pelados em Santos" of its debauchery.

The band's position 
Members Branco Mello (vocals), Nando Reis (vocals, bass) and Sérgio Britto (vocals, keyboards) commented: "Since 'Sonífera Ilha', a song made to be a hit, people mess around with us. We want to be TV stars [...] The guy who makes music just for selling doesn't exist. First, we do music for our entertainment. [...] This is independent from our will. We make a consuming product. Everyone has the right to say whatever they want, but, for us, the priority is artistic".

Producer Jack Endino said that there are elements of pop in the band's two previous albums, the well-sold Acústico MTV and Volume Dois, and in all their seven albums released before Titanomaquia (first Titãs album produced by him). He added:

Personnel
Titãs
 Branco Mello - lead vocals on "Gostava Tanto de Você" and "Rotina", co-lead vocals on "Pelados em Santos"
 Paulo Miklos - lead vocals on "Fuga Nº 11" and "Um Certo Alguém", co-lead vocals on "Aluga-se", harmonica, mandolin, banjo, backing vocals
 Nando Reis - lead vocals on "Circo de Feras" and "Ciúmes", co-lead vocals on "Pelados em Santos", bass
 Sérgio Britto - lead vocals on "Sete Cidades" and "Querem Acabar Comigo", co-lead vocals on "Aluga-se", organ, piano, mellotron, wurlitzer, backing vocals
 Tony Bellotto - acoustic, electric and twelve string guitar
 Marcelo Fromer - acoustic and electric guitar
 Charles Gavin - drums

Additional personnel
 Jack Endino - bass in "Um Certo Alguém", electronic drums arrangement in "Fuga n° II", guitar and backing vocals in "Aluga-se"
 Edu Morelenbaum - conducting
 Eumir Deodato - conducting
 Ricardo Imperatore - percussion
 Paschoal Perrota - violin and arrangement
 Cassia Menezes - cello
 Marcio Malard - cello
 Paula Prates - violin
 Ricardo Amado da Silva - violin
 Antonella Pareschi - violin
 Jesuina Passaroto - viola
 Bernard Marie Bessler - viola
 Daniel Garcia - saxophone, flute, saxophone solo in "Gostava Tanto de Você"
 Roberto Marques - trombone
 Altair Martins - trumpet, flugelhorn
 Ron Lawrence - viola
 N. Cenovia Cummins - violin
 Todd Reynolds - violin
 Richard Lucker - cello
 Maxine Neuman - cello
 Joyce Hammann - violin
 Robert Shaw - violin
 Stuart Mac Donald - tenor saxophone
 Jim Sisko - trumpet
 David Marriott, Jr. - trombone

Technical personnel
 Bae arrangements: Jack Endino and Titãs
 String and brass arrangements: Eumir Deodato (except "Rotina" and "Ciúmes", by Titãs and Jack Endino)
 Studios: Iron Wood Studios (Seattle), Hanzeck Audio (Seattle), Avatar Studios (NY), Ar Estúdio (RJ), Blue Studio (RJ) e ARP Estúdio (SP)
 ExcExecutive production: Charles Gavin
 Artistic direction: Tom Capone
 Recording engineering (Seattle): Jack Endino e Kip Beelman
 Recording assistants (Seattle): Donn Devore, Kip Beelman e Floyd Reitsma
 Recording engineering (NY): Álvaro Alencar
 Recording assistant (NY): Gregg Gasperino
 Recording engineering  (RJ): Álvaro Alencar
 Recording assistants (RJ): André Rattones e Luciano Tarta
 Recording engineering  (SP): Roberto Marques
 Recording assistant (SP): Nelson Damascena
 Mixing: Studio X (Seattle)
 Mixing engineering: Jack Endino
 Mixing assistant: Sam Hofstedt
 Mastering engineering: George Marino and Jack Endino (at Sterling Sound, NY)
 Graphic coordination: Silvia Panella
 Cover: Desenho Brasa
 Photos: Rochelle Costi
 Photo assistant: Marcelo Zochio
 Costume design: Cristiane Mesquita and Lilian Varella
 Roadies: Sérgio Molina, Sombra Jones and Viça

References 

1999 albums
Titãs albums
Covers albums
Hollywood Records albums
Warner Music Group albums
Albums produced by Jack Endino